Francisco Isoldi (13 July 1923 – 14 June 1994) was a Brazilian sailor. He competed in the Dragon event at the 1952 Summer Olympics.

References

External links
 

1923 births
1994 deaths
Brazilian male sailors (sport)
Olympic sailors of Brazil
Sailors at the 1952 Summer Olympics – Dragon
Place of birth missing